Chieftains 7 or The Chieftains 7 is an album by The Chieftains, the first album which featured Kevin Conneff as a full member of the band. In 1995 The Chieftains re-recorded the track "O'Sullivan's March" for the soundtrack to the movie Rob Roy starring Liam Neeson and Jessica Lange.

Track listing
 "Away We Go Again" – 6:22
 "Dochas" – 3:47
 "Hedigan's Fancy" – 3:47
 "John O'Connor and the Ode to Whiskey" – 2:38
 "Friel's Kitchen" – 4:41
 "No. 6 The Coombe" – 3:50
 "O'Sullivan's March" – 4:00
 "The Ace and the Deuce of Pipering" – 3:23
 "The Fairies' Lamentation And Dance" – 6:52
 "Oh! The Breeches Full of Stitches" – 4:21

Personnel
Paddy Moloney - uillean pipes, tin whistle
Seán Potts - tin whistle, bones
Seán Keane - fiddle, tin whistle
Martin Fay - fiddle, bones
Michael Tubridy - flute, concertina and tin whistle
Derek Bell - neo-Irish harp, medieval harps, tiompán, oboe
Kevin Conneff - bodhrán

References

The Chieftains albums
1978 albums
Claddagh Records albums